UIS may refer to:

Uis, a village in Erongo Region, Namibia
Underwater Inspection System, a component of the Underwater Port Security System developed for the United States Coast Guard
Universal Interactive Studios (now Vivendi Games)
University of Illinois Springfield, a public four-year university in the United States
Universidad Industrial de Santander, Colombia
University of Stavanger, Norway
Union Internationale de Spéléologie, an international umbrella organization for caving and speleology
Unisys Corporation NYSE stock symbol
UIs, plural abbreviation of user interface
Uisai language, ISO 639-3 code
Umpire Information System, made by QuesTec and used for providing feedback and evaluation of Major League umpires
UNESCO Institute for Statistics

See also
UI (disambiguation)